The Citadel Bulldogs basketball teams represented The Citadel, The Military College of South Carolina in Charleston, South Carolina, United States.  The program was established in 1900–01, and has continuously fielded a team since 1912–13.  Their primary rivals are College of Charleston, Furman and VMI.

1929–30

1930–31

1931–32

1932–33

1933–34

1934–35

1935–36

1936–37

1937–38

|-
|colspan=5 align=center|1938 Southern Conference men's basketball tournament

1938–39

With season sweeps of South Carolina, Furman, Wofford, and Presbyterian, a win in their only matchup with Newberry and a season split with Clemson, the Bulldogs claim a South Carolina "state championship" for the 1938–39 season.

|-
|colspan=5 align=center|1939 Southern Conference men's basketball tournament

References
 

The Citadel Bulldogs basketball seasons